Nephopterix hajastanica is a species of snout moth in the genus Nephopterix. It was described by Harutiunian in 1989. It is found in Armenia.

References

Moths described in 1989
Phycitini